Eugenijus Mindaugas Budrys  (1925–2007) was a Lithuanian painter. He has created landscapes, still lifes, figurative and abstract compositions (No. 2, Meeting), and wall paintings for the interiors of public buildings in Stockholm, Herns, Visby, Vasteras and other Swedish cities.

See also
List of Lithuanian painters

References

1925 births
2007 deaths
20th-century Lithuanian painters